Destination Victoria Station is a 1975 album by country music singer Johnny Cash. It was offered as a Columbia Special Product and could only be bought at Victoria Station restaurants. Cash re-recorded several of his old train songs for this album, including "Waitin' for a Train", "Wreck of the Ol' 97" and "John Henry", and one new song, "Destination Victoria Station". In addition to re-recording songs, Cash also re-recorded his vocals on "Wabash Cannonball" and "Orange Blossom Special", both retaining their original 1960s backing tracks. The title track had previously been featured on a live album, but the recording for this release was a new studio performance. The album also included several tracks lifted from previously released albums. To date this album has never been released on CD and due to its heavy reliance on previously released recordings was omitted from the otherwise-comprehensive 2012 box set Johnny Cash: The Complete Columbia Album Collection.

Track listing

See also
List of train songs

Johnny Cash albums
1975 albums